Troy McHenry Walters (born December 15, 1976) is an American football coach and former player who is the wide receivers coach for the Cincinnati Bengals of the National Football League (NFL). Walters played as a wide receiver and punt returner in the National Football League (NFL) for eight seasons. Walters played college football for Stanford University, was a consensus All-American and was recognized as the outstanding college wide receiver in the country. He was selected in the fifth round of the 2000 NFL Draft by the Minnesota Vikings, and also played for the Indianapolis Colts, Arizona Cardinals and Detroit Lions of the NFL.

Early years
Walters was born in Bloomington, Indiana. He attended A&M Consolidated High School in College Station, Texas, and was a letterman in football, basketball and track. In football, as a senior, he was named to the Texas Magazine First-team; he also was a second-team All-Greater Houston selection and a third-team all-state selection.

College career
After accepting an athletic scholarship to attend Stanford University, Walters played for the Stanford Cardinal football team from 1996 to 1999. As a senior in 1999, he was recognized as consensus first-team All-American and won the Fred Biletnikoff Award. He finished his college career with 244 catches and over 3,900 receiving yards, and currently ranks as Stanford's all-time leader in receptions and receiving yards.

Professional career
He subsequently played for the Indianapolis Colts (–), Arizona Cardinals and Detroit Lions. During his eight-season NFL career, he played in 98 games, compiled 102 receptions for 1,135 yards and nine touchdowns, returned 117 kickoffs for 2,594 yards, and returned 139 punts for 1,241 yards.

Coaching career
Walters joined the staff at Indiana State University as their offensive coordinator, quarterbacks coach, and wide receivers coach. He then left to become the wide receivers coach at Texas A&M University from 2010 to 2011. He then had stints at North Carolina State University in 2012, and at the University of Colorado Boulder from 2013 to 2015 as a wide receivers coach.

Walters joined Scott Frost's staff at the University of Central Florida as offensive coordinator and wide receivers coach in 2016. Walters was a finalist for the Broyles Award, presented to the top assistant coach in college football in December 2017.

Walters followed Frost to Nebraska to become the offensive coordinator and wide receivers coach in December 2017. On January 17, 2020, the University of Nebraska and Walters parted ways.

Walters was hired by the Cincinnati Bengals as their assistant wide receivers coach on February 10, 2020. He assumed Bob Bicknell's wide receivers coaching duties for the team's weeks 10 and 11 games in 2020 against the Pittsburgh Steelers and Washington Football Team due to Bicknell missing the games for COVID-19 pandemic protocols.

References

External links
 Cincinnati Bengals profile

1976 births
Living people
American football return specialists
American football wide receivers
Arizona Cardinals players
Cincinnati Bengals coaches
Colorado Buffaloes football coaches
Detroit Lions players
Indiana State Sycamores football coaches
Indianapolis Colts players
Minnesota Vikings players
Nebraska Cornhuskers football coaches
NC State Wolfpack football coaches
Stanford Cardinal football players
Texas A&M Aggies football coaches
UCF Knights football coaches
All-American college football players
Sportspeople from Bloomington, Indiana
People from College Station, Texas
Players of American football from Texas
African-American coaches of American football
African-American players of American football